SAP Fieldglass is a software company providing a cloud-based Vendor Management System (VMS) to manage services procurement and external workforce management programs. It is headquartered in Chicago, Illinois.

History
Fieldglass was founded by Jai Shekhawat, Anil Kumar, and Udai Kumar on November 12, 1999. It was acquired by SAP in 2014 and is now a subsidiary.

In 2017, SAP Fieldglass was rated "a leader" in The Forrester Wave™: Services Procurement, Q1, 2017 Report by Forrester Research, Inc. for services procurement providers.

As of early 2018, SAP Fieldglass was deployed in more than 180 countries and 21 languages, with offices in Chicago, London, and Brisbane.

See also 
 SAP Concur
 SAP Ariba

References

External links
  SAP Fieldglass website

Software companies established in 1999
Software companies based in Illinois
Companies based in Chicago
Software companies of the United States
1999 establishments in Illinois